Vojislav "Vojkan" Borisavljević  (5 May 1947 – 23 February 2021) was a Serbian composer and conductor. He composed more than five hundred songs for the most famous Yugoslav singers - Leo Martin, Zdravko Colic, George Marjanovic, Miki Jevremovic, and many others, as well as for numerous television series and films, such as the series Gray Home and Hot Wind, and the film Barking at the Stars, for whose music he was awarded the Golden Mimosa at the Yugoslav Film Festival in Herceg Novi in 1997.

Borisavljević was born in Zrenjanin. He was the author of the songs "Odyssey", "Love is just a word", "And now goodbye, I love you". He died in Belgrade, aged 73.

References

External links

 

Serbian composers
1947 births
2021 deaths
People from Zrenjanin